The 24th CARIFTA Games was held in George Town, Cayman Islands, on April 15–17, 1995.

Participation (unofficial)

Detailed result lists can be found on the "World Junior Athletics History" website.  An unofficial count yields the number of about 249 athletes (145 junior (under-20) and 104 youth (under-17)) from about 19 countries:  Antigua and Barbuda (3), Aruba (3), Bahamas (33), Barbados (35), Bermuda (12), British Virgin Islands (4), Cayman Islands (8), Dominica (3), French Guiana (2), Grenada (3), Guadeloupe (18), Guyana (5), Jamaica (61), Martinique (15), Saint Kitts and Nevis (5), Saint Lucia (4), Trinidad and Tobago (29), Turks and Caicos Islands (2), US Virgin Islands (4).

Austin Sealy Award

The Austin Sealy Trophy for the most outstanding athlete of the games was awarded to Debbie Ferguson from the Bahamas.  She won 3 gold medals (100m, 200m, and 4 × 100m relay) and a silver medal (4 × 400m relay) in the junior (U-20) category.  In total, she won 7 gold, 9 silver, and 2 bronze CARIFTA games medals.

Medal summary
Medal winners are published by category: Boys under 20 (Junior), Girls under 20 (Junior), Boys under 17 (Youth), and Girls under 17 (Youth).
Complete results can be found on the "World Junior Athletics History"
website.

Boys under 20 (Junior)

Girls under 20 (Junior)

Boys under 17 (Youth)

Girls under 17 (Youth)

Medal table (unofficial)

References

External links
World Junior Athletics History

CARIFTA Games
International sports competitions hosted by the Cayman Islands
CARIFTA Games
CARIFTA
1995 in Caribbean sport
Athletics competitions in the Cayman Islands